North Greenford United Football Club is a football club based in Greenford in the London Borough of Ealing, England. The club is affiliated to the Middlesex County Football Association.

History

Established in 1944, originally as a youth club and started playing senior football in the 1946–47 season when they joined the Hanwell and District League, finishing as runners-up at the first attempt. A season later the club joined the Harrow Wembley League, and winning the senior division of that league at the end of the 1954–55 season. The club then played in the Middlesex League Premier Division In the 1982–83 season they won the Middlesex League Premier Division and gained promotion to Division One of the London Spartan League.

At the end of the 1987–88 season the club gained promotion to the Premier Division of the London Spartan League. At the end of the 1993–94 season the club left the Spartan league, and dropped down a level to the Middlesex County Football League Premier Division. The club then lost its senior status with the Middlesex County Football Association and spent the next few seasons upgrading their ground to move from intermediate status back up to senior status. This work culminated in the club being elected to the Combined Counties Football League for the start of the 2002–03 season.

The club finished as runners-up in the league in their third season in the league. That season, they also made their debut in the FA Cup, making it to the first qualifying round before being knocked out by Hemel Hempstead Town. The club then repeated this finish four seasons later in the 2008–09 season. The following season the club went one better as they became champions of the Combined Counties Football League, and earned promotion to Division One Central of the Southern Football League. They also completed a double by winning the Middlesex Senior Charity Cup when they beat Enfield Town 1–0 in the final at The Beveree Stadium.

North Greenford United finished 18th in the 2010–11 campaign, in their first season at that level. After a disappointing opening half to the 2011–12 campaign, the club announced that they had parted company with manager Steve Ringrose who had been in charge for three years. On Boxing Day 2011, the club confirmed the appointment of ex-Chelsea, Wimbledon and Crystal Palace striker Neil Shipperley as their new manager. He was assisted by ex-Chelsea team-mate Mark Nicholls.

However upon the conclusion of the season, Shipperley resigned to look for a management position at a higher level after successfully guiding the side to safety. The club appointed former Bedfont Town midfielder and caretaker boss Jon-Barrie Bates as his successor in early June. Bates was sacked after just eight games following the club's poor start to the season paving the way for the return of Shipperley for a second spell as manager.

On 17 August 2013, former professional goalkeeper Dave Beasant came out of retirement for one game at the age of 54, to appear for North Greenford United in their 2–0 defeat to Chalfont St Peter.

Neil Shipperley resigned from his position of manager in February 2014, and he was replaced by reserve team boss Paul Palmer shortly after. Palmer, however, was sacked after a 4–1 defeat to Chalfont St Peter on 11 September 2014. Don Bennett was appointed as caretaker with his first game in charge a 1–1 draw with Uxbridge.

Bennett was then appointed as the permanent successor to Palmer, but resigned in December 2014. Reserve team manager Barry Morris was placed in caretaker charge.

The club had narrowly avoided relegation in the previous two seasons, but were set to be relegated after finishing 21st in 2015 before being handed a relegation reprieve. They therefore remained in the Southern Football League for the 2015-16 season.

After being handed a reprieve from relegation, the board appointed Morris as manager on a permanent basis after an upturn in results towards the end of the 2014-15 season. Morris and his coaching staff were tasked with trying to keep North Greenford United in the Southern Football League.

Morris was replaced by assistant George Bouhet early into the 2015-16 season, but Bouhet left the club in November 2015 following a poor run of results. On 7 November 2015, former North Greenford United players Ricky Pither and Danny Bennell were appointed joint-managers with another former North Greenford player, Chris Mills, and Mark Chandler joining as assistant coaches.

However, North Greenford United's six-year stay at Step 4 came to an end on 19 April 2016 as a 3-1 defeat to Kings Langley confirmed their relegation from the Southern Football League. In June 2016, North Greenford successfully appealed against their placement in the Hellenic Football League and were instead placed in the equivalent, but enlarged, Combined Counties League Premier Division. At the end of the 2020–21 season the club were transferred to the Premier Division North of the Combined Counties League.

Ground

North Greenford United play their games at Berkeley Fields, Berkeley Avenue, Greenford, UB6 0NX.

Honours

League honours
Combined Counties Football League Premier Division :
 Winners (1): 2009–10
 Runners-up (2): 2004–05, 2008–09
Middlesex League Premier Division:
 Winners (1): 1982–83 
 Runners-up (1): 1972–73
Harrow Wembley League Senior Division:
 Winners (1): 1954–55
Hanwell and District League:
 Runners-up (1): 1946–47

Cup honours
Combined Counties Football League Premier Challenge Cup:
 Runners-up (2): 2003–04, 2006–07
Middlesex Senior Charity Cup:
 Winners (1): 2009–10
The Harry Sutherland Shield:
 Winners (2): 1984–85, 1985–86
West London Combination Cup:
 Winners (2): 1966–67, 1967–68
Kings College Hospital Cup :
 Winners (2): 1968–69, 1969–70
Hounslow Senior Charity Cup :
 Winners (1): 1970–71
 Runners-up (1): 1972–73
Harrow Wembley League Senior Cup:
 Winners (1): 1956–57
Brentford League Senior Cup :
 Winners (2): 1961–62, 1963–64
 Runners-up (2): 1959–60, 1964–65
Harrow Senior Charity Cup:
 Winners (1): 1964–65
Middlesex Intermediate Cup :
 Winners (1): 1973–74
Middlesex Junior Cup :
 Runners-up (1): 1956–57
Richmond Challenge Cup:
 Winners (1): 1959–60
Hanwell Hospital Cup :
 Runners-up (1): 1946–47

Records

Highest League Position: 18th, Southern League Division One Central, 2010–11
FA Cup best performance: Third Qualifying Round – 2010–11, 2011–12
FA Trophy best performance: First Qualifying round 2010-11
FA Vase best performance: Third Round 2020-21

References

External links
Official website

Southern Football League clubs
Association football clubs established in 1944
Football clubs in England
Football clubs in London
Sport in the London Borough of Ealing
1944 establishments in England
Middlesex County Football League
Spartan South Midlands Football League
Combined Counties Football League